Prabodh Chandra may refer to: 
Prabodh Chandra Bagchi, academician
Prabodh Chandra Goswami, teacher
Prabodh Chandra Sengupta, academician
Prabodh Chandra Dey, Indian singer
Prabodh Chandra (politician)

Hindu given names
Indian masculine given names